The 1981 Maine Black Bears football team represented the University of Maine as a member of the Yankee Conference during the 1981 NCAA Division I-AA football season. Led by first-year head coach Ron Rogerson, the Black Bears compiled an overall record of 3–7–1 and a mark of 1–4 in conference play, tying for fifth place in the Yankee Conference.

Schedule

Roster

References

Maine
Maine Black Bears football seasons
Maine Black Bears football